County is a Liverpool City Council Ward in the Liverpool Walton Parliamentary constituency. The population at the 2011 census was 14,045. It contains the Walton area of Liverpool, England. The ward boundary was changed at the 2004 municipal elections.

Councillors

 indicates seat up for re-election after boundary changes.

 indicates seat up for re-election.

 indicates change in affiliation.

 indicates seat up for re-election after casual vacancy.

Election results

Elections of the 2010s 

{{Election box candidate with party link|
  |party      = Labour Party (UK)
  |candidate  = Gerard Woodhouse
  |votes      = 2,023
  |percentage = 86.64%
  |change     =  13.45
}}

 Elections of the 2000s 

After the boundary change of 2004 the whole of Liverpool City Council faced election. Three Councillors were returned.

• italics'' - Denotes sitting Councillor.
• bold - Denotes the winning candidate.

External links
Ward Profile

References

Wards of Liverpool